Dows is a city in Franklin and Wright counties of the U.S. state of Iowa. The population was 521 at the time of the 2020 census. The town was incorporated on May 3, 1892.

History
Dows got its start in the year 1880, following construction of the railroad through that territory. Dows is named for a railroad contractor, Col. William Greene Dows.

Historical sites
The Dows Historical Society and community volunteers have restored several historical buildings, three of which are listed on the National Register of Historic Places. The Rock Island Depot in Dows was built in 1896. The historical society purchased and restored the depot in 1988 that houses an Iowa Welcome Center and historical railroad and community memorabilia. The Quasdorf Blacksmith and Wagon Museum was built in 1899 and was restored in 1990. This is one of the best equipped blacksmith shops in the Midwest. The Fillmore Building, a large cornerstone building on the south side of Main Street, was built in 1894 and has housed many businesses over the years. In 1987 the building was purchased by the historical society and restored. In 1989, the Dows Mercantile and Crème de la Crème were opened in the building. The Dows Mercantile is an antique mall covering three floors. The Crème de la Crème is a sandwich shop/ice cream parlor.

The Vernon Township Schoolhouse was built in 1887 and is a typical of what one-room, country schoolhouses were like in the 19th and early 20th centuries. The building was moved to town and was restored both inside and out. The schoolhouse is furnished with original desks, blackboards, and books. Another historical building located in the downtown area is the Evans Prairie Home, located across from the Welcome Center.

Geography

Dows is located at  (42.656882, -93.502175).

Demographics

2010 census
As of the census of 2010, there were 538 people, 250 households, and 142 families residing in the city. The racial makeup of the city was 93.3% White, 1.3% African American, 0.2% Asian, 3.9% from other races, and 1.3% from two or more races. Hispanic or Latino of any race were 18.4% of the population.

There were 250 households, of which 21.2% had children under the age of 18 living with them, 44.8% were married couples living together, 7.6% had a female householder with no husband present, 4.4% had a male householder with no wife present, and 43.2% were non-families. 38.4% of all households were made up of individuals, and 19.2% had someone living alone who was 65 years of age or older. The average household size was 2.15 and the average family size was 2.77.

The median age in the city was 47.8 years. 19.5% of residents were under the age of 18; 5.5% were between the ages of 18 and 24; 20.2% were from 25 to 44; 29.3% were from 45 to 64; and 25.5% were 65 years of age or older. The gender makeup of the city was 48.9% male and 51.1% female.

2000 census
As of the census of 2000, there were 675 people, 290 households, and 164 families residing in the city. The racial makeup of the city was 92.30% White, 0.89% Asian, 6.37% from other races, and 0.44% from two or more races. Hispanic or Latino of any race were 9.19% of the population.

There were 290 households, out of which 21.7% had children under the age of 18 living with them, 47.2% were married couples living together, 7.6% had a female householder with no husband present, and 43.4% were non-families. 40.0% of all households were made up of individuals, and 23.1% had someone living alone who was 65 years of age or older. The average household size was 2.21 and the average family size was 2.97.

20.0% were under the age of 18, 7.4% from 18 to 24, 25.5% from 25 to 44, 20.9% from 45 to 64, and 26.2% were 65 years of age or older. The median age was 42 years. For every 100 females, there were 89.6 males. For every 100 females age 18 and over, there were 85.6 males.

The median income for a household in the city was $26,141, and the median income for a family was $35,156. Males had a median income of $22,386 versus $25,500 for females. The per capita income for the city was $15,109. About 8.1% of families and 7.7% of the population were below the poverty line, including 9.1% of those under age 18 and 7.4% of those age 65 or over.

Convention Center
In 2003, the Dows Community Convention Center was built on Ellsworth Street. The building was modeled similarly to the Exchange Block that once stood as the cornerstone building to the north side of Ellsworth Street. The building includes a  convention room and a  meeting room. Also included is a large kitchen as well as many tables, internet hook ups, and nice restrooms. The building also houses the city offices.

Education
Previously before the year 2014, the school located in Dows was in use. Due to fewer students in 2014, the school had to close down. The current community is within the Clarion–Goldfield–Dows Community School District, which was formed by the merger of the Dows Community School District and the Clarion–Goldfield Community School District on July 1, 2014. The school property in Dows was later on purchased.

Churches
The Dows area is home to several churches. Located in town are the Abundant Life Chapel, Sovereign Grace Church, United Methodist Church, First Presbyterian Church, and First Lutheran Church. The United Methodist Church and the First Presbyterian Church share a pastor with the Alexander United Methodist Church. The Sovereign Grace Church meets in the First Presbyterian Church and is an independent reformed church. Located six miles east of town is the Morgan Methodist Church. Also, southwest of town is the Vernon Lutheran Church, which no longer has services.

Dows Corn Days
The first weekend in August always marks a large celebration, the Dows Corn Days. The festivities include an impressive parade, entertainment in the park, food vendors, inflatable rides, several activities, and a community church service.

Rest area/travel center
A new rest area was built near the interstate with a Civil War theme in 2003. The "Dows Junction" travel center includes a gas station/truck stop, convenience store, and fast food restaurant (Arby's). It is hoped the two projects along with the convention center and historical sites will encourage tourism and economic development.

References 
 

Cities in Iowa
Cities in Wright County, Iowa
Cities in Franklin County, Iowa
Populated places established in 1880
1880 establishments in Iowa